List of communities in Victoria County, Nova Scotia

 Baddeck: a village within the Municipality of the County of Victoria
Unincorporated areas 
Big Bras d'Or
Cape North
Dingwall
Englishtown
Ingonish
Iona
Neil's Harbour
St. Anns
South Harbour
Wagmatcook 1 and Wagmatcook First Nation, reserves

Victoria County, Nova Scotia